The Strengthen the Arm of Liberty Monument in Overland Park, Kansas, is a replica of the Statue of Liberty (Liberty Enlightening the World). It was placed by the Boy Scouts of America as part of its 1950s era campaign, "Strengthen the Arm of Liberty".

Background
Strengthen the Arm of Liberty was the theme of the Boy Scouts of America's fortieth anniversary celebration in 1950. Approximately 200 BSA Statue of Liberty replicas were installed across the United States.
It is located on the west side of Shawnee Mission North High School.

See also

Scouting museums
Scouting memorials

References

External links

Buildings and structures in Overland Park, Kansas
Monuments and memorials in Kansas
Outdoor sculptures in Kansas
Overland, Kansas
Sculptures of women in Kansas
Statues in Kansas